Cumbres de hidalguía is a 1947 Argentine dramatic adventure film directed by Julio Saraceni and written by Luis Olivo Gallo. It stars Roberto Airaldi, Ricardo Passano and Malisa Zini.

Plot
An engineer leads an expedition to the summit of a mountain and is blamed when a young girl on the team plummets to her death.

Cast
 Roberto Airaldi
 Ricardo Passano
 Malisa Zini
 Carlos Perelli
 Cirilo Etulain
 Alba Castellanos
 Joaquín Petrosino
 Jacinto Herrera
 Roberto Bordoni
 Manuel Alcón
 Enrique Thomas
 Hugo Ferrer
 Rodolfo San Angelo
 Juan Solucio
 José Helman

Reception
Clarín wrote:  "The dramatic intensity of the film is achieved only by the fire of human feelings for the violent explosion of nature. There is a snowstorm on the peaks of the mountains, rarely seen in films." Raúl Manrupe and María Alejandra Portela believed that  the difficult terrain and snowstorm in the film affected the performances.

References

External links 
 

1947 films
1940s Spanish-language films
Argentine black-and-white films
Films directed by Julio Saraceni
1940s adventure drama films
Argentine adventure drama films
1947 drama films
1940s Argentine films